Hakeem Khaaliq (also Hakeem Abdul-Khaaliq) is an American cinematographer, television producer, film director, photographer, multi-media activist, graphic design artist, and visual anthropologist. Before his career in film and television he worked as a music producer, music publisher, music supervisor and radio personality. In 1995 Khaaliq founded Radio Bums and in 2010 he co-founded Nation19 magazine / APDTA with longtime partner Queen Muhammad Ali.

Early life and career 
Khaaliq was born and raised in South Central, Los Angeles, CA. His father was a stuntman with work featured in the film The Spook Who Sat By The Door. Khaaliq credits longtime family friend Howard Bingham and his mentor Jamel Shabazz as his greatest influences in photography. Early in his career, Khaaliq began directing and producing documentary films (the first film he directed starred Snoop Dogg and Sean Puffy Combs), and then began making films and exhibits on global issues.

Works

Film and television

 Comin' Up Short(feature documentary film) 
The Last Matai
 #War on Us - United Nations (UNGASS)
 #Bars4Justice
 Bigg Snoop Dogg, Raw N Uncut
 The Tale of Timmy Two Chins - Showtime
 Judge Lauren Lake's Paternity Court for MGM Television.
 ¿Quiénes son los Afro-Mexicanos?
 T.I.'s Road To Redemption - MTV
 Beauty Shop - Metro-Goldwyn-Mayer (MGM)
 Adventures in Hollyhood - MTV
 Made in Amerikkka
 Tha Bizness.

References

American cinematographers
Living people
African-American record producers
American hip hop DJs
American hip hop record producers
African-American male actors
African-American film directors
African-American film producers
African-American screenwriters
American documentary filmmakers
American male film actors
American film directors
American film producers
African-American television producers
American television producers
American music video directors
American male screenwriters
African-American photographers
American photographers
Street photographers
Visual anthropologists
Record producers from California
21st-century American photographers
Year of birth missing (living people)
21st-century African-American artists
African-American male writers